Alan E. Sears is an American lawyer. He served as the president, CEO, and general counsel of the Alliance Defending Freedom until January 2017. Sears was also the staff executive director of the Attorney General's Commission on Pornography, popularly known as the Meese Commission.

Education, faith, and family
Sears graduated with a bachelor's degree from the University of Louisville. He earned a J.D. degree from the University of Louisville Louis D. Brandeis School of Law.

Sears was raised in the Baptist church, but converted to Roman Catholicism in 1988 before marrying his wife, Paula.
Sears and Paula were jointly invested in the Pontifical Equestrian Order of St. Gregory the Great on June 29, 2017.

Career

Government
Sears served as a prosecutor in the U.S. Attorney's office for western Kentucky. During his time as a federal prosecutor Sears served as staff executive director of the Attorney General's Commission on Pornography also known as the Meese Commission. This commission was established by Attorney General William French Smith at the direction of President Reagan in early 1985. The commission became popularly known as the Meese Commission after Edwin Meese III, Smith's successor, announced the names of its eleven members in May 1985. Although he was not a voting member, Sears was influential on the commission and vigorously supported strengthening anti-obscenity laws.

Sears served as associate solicitor under Secretary Donald Hodel at the Department of the Interior.

Alliance Defending Freedom
Sears led the Alliance Defending Freedom (ADF), a Christian right legal advocacy group founded in 1994, for more than twenty years. Under his leadership, the ADF won a string of victories in lawsuits on behalf of the conservative Christian movement. By 2014, the ADF had an annual budget of $40 million and more than 40 staff attorneys, and had "emerged as the largest legal force of the religious right, arguing hundreds of pro bono cases across the country." Sears retired as ADF's president and CEO in 2017.

In June 2017, Sears was named a knight of the Papal Order of St. Gregory.

Writing

The ACLU vs. America
In 2005, Sears wrote the book The ACLU vs. America with Craig Osten.

The Homosexual Agenda

This 2003 book was described by the Southern Poverty Law Center as "an anti-LGBT call to arms that links homosexuality to pedophilia and other 'disordered sexual behavior'". The book was accused of claiming that allowing same-sex marriage was a part of a secret agenda by activists to “lead young men and women into homosexual behavior” and trap them in a homosexual lifestyle. The book also accused gay-rights advocates as trying to create a nation of “broken families and broken lives.”

Bibliography
 

Additional books by Alan Sears:  Novels "In Justice", self-published through the Christian publishing house WinePress Publishing and "Trial & Error", self-published through the Christian Xulon Press.

References

External links
 
 

Alliance Defending Freedom people
Living people
University of Louisville alumni
University of Louisville School of Law alumni
American lawyers
Year of birth missing (living people)